The 2012 Negros earthquake occurred on February 6 at , with a body wave magnitude of 6.7 and a maximum intensity of VII (Destructive) off the coast of Negros Oriental, Philippines.

Earthquake
The recorded intensities according to the Philippine Institute of Volcanology and Seismology (PHIVOLCS) on the Earthquake Intensity Scale (PEIS) were VII in Dumaguete and V in Cebu. The earthquake was felt as far as Mindanao in the provinces of Misamis and Lanao as well as Iligan.

Geology

The Philippines lies within the Pacific Ring of Fire, which results in the archipelago experiencing frequent volcanic and seismic activity. The strongest earthquake to hit Negros occurred in 1948, but did not cause any damage.

According to PHIVOLCS, the earthquake was caused by movement on a previously undiscovered fault. However, according to an Environmental Sciences professor, this fault was already known to private geologists hired by the Negros Occidental government to create a land use map for the province.

Tsunami warning
The Philippine Institute of Volcanology and Seismology (PHIVOLCS) issued a level two tsunami alert, indicating that the public should be alert for "unusual waves", but no formal evacuation orders were issued. Coastal areas on the eastern seaboard of Negros Oriental from San Jose to Vallehermoso, and on the western side of Cebu from Badian to Barili were also reported to have been affected by the tsunami, though no widespread damage was reported.

"Chona Mae" hoax
In Cebu City, rumors that a tsunami had hit the coastal villages of Ermita, Mambaling, and Pasil, with some reports saying that the tsunami had reached as far as Barangay Lahug, forced residents into a panic. This is despite the fact that Cebu City, being on the eastern side of Cebu island, is opposite to the side facing Negros, the epicenter of the earthquake, and could not have been hit by a tsunami from the earthquake. The ensuing panic forced many businesses, schools, and offices in Cebu City to close for the day.

The cause of the panic was credited to, anecdotally, have come from someone who was calling out for someone named "Chona Mae", which eventually morphed mistakenly into a cry for "tsunami". The earthquake, which happened nearly a year after the 2011 Tōhoku earthquake and tsunami and its effects in Japan, was also attributed as a factor to the panic.

Some residents of Dumaguete also scrambled to the mountain town of Valencia also because of rumors of a tsunami, which were later confirmed to be false. PHIVOLCS issued the tsunami alert at 14:30 PST, however no tsunami followed.

Damage and effects

The degree and extent of damage caused by the earthquake was significant, with most of the damage sustained during the initial earthquake. The towns that experienced the most damage were the towns of Tayasan, Jimalalud, La Libertad, and the city of Guihulngan, in Negros Oriental. Several houses and buildings collapsed, while others sustained more minor damage. The earthquake also triggered numerous landslides which buried houses and people, including in the areas of Barangay Solongon, La Libertad and Planas, Guihulngan.

Telecommunication services were disrupted after the earthquake.

Water
Water was cut off in several places, primarily the isolated remote towns. Guihulngan, one of the cities affected by the earthquake, suffered extensive damage. Its water services, along with electricity and telecommunications, were reported to be cut off.

Electricity
After the initial earthquake, the power supply was suddenly disrupted in affected areas after power lines were damaged. Power plants in Visayas tripped or shut down following the earthquake, although no major damage was sustained in transmission facilities. On February 8, power was restored in some areas.

Transport
The transport network of some parts of Cebu and Negros Oriental suffered severe disruptions. Main arterial roads were damaged, although automobiles and people could still pass through. A small number of roads, especially in the mountainous territories, were thought to be destroyed. A total of three roads and ten bridges were destroyed. Because of damage to roads and bridges, access to some remote villages was no longer possible. Most of the damage experienced was in north Negros Oriental, which is more mountainous than the rest of Negros Oriental.

Cultural and governmental properties
Among the properties destroyed by the earthquake were the public market and the courthouse of Guihulngan. The Aglipay Church in La Libertad also collapsed.

See also 
List of earthquakes in 2012
2013 Bohol earthquake 
List of earthquakes in the Philippines

References

External links

Visayas earthquake
2012 disasters in the Philippines
History of Cebu
Earthquakes in the Philippines
2012 in the Philippines
History of Negros Oriental
February 2012 events in the Philippines
Buried rupture earthquakes